KCKQ (1180 AM) was a radio station licensed to serve the community of Sparks, Nevada. The station was owned by Lotus Communications, through licensee Lotus Radio Corp., and aired a community radio format.

The station was assigned the KCKQ call letters by the Federal Communications Commission on February 5, 2012. Its license was surrendered December 9, 2020.

References

External links
 Official Website
 FCC Public Inspection File for KCKQ
FCC Station Search Details: DKCKQ (Facility ID: 160544)

CKQ
Radio stations established in 2015
2015 establishments in Nevada
Lotus Communications stations
Community radio stations in the United States
Washoe County, Nevada
Radio stations disestablished in 2020
2020 disestablishments in Nevada
Defunct radio stations in the United States
Defunct community radio stations in the United States
CKQ